Alex Faust (born January 14, 1989) is an American television sportscaster who is currently the television play-by-play voice for the Los Angeles Kings of the National Hockey League (NHL). He gained additional fame in 2018 when Jeopardy! host Alex Trebek suggested that Faust could replace him as the show's host.

Early life and education
Born and raised in Brooklyn, New York, Faust is the son of television producers. He graduated from Northeastern University in Boston, Massachusetts, in 2012, with a degree in political science and economics.

Career 
Faust started his broadcasting career as a student at Northeastern University, calling Huskies basketball and ice hockey on WRBB, the student radio station. After graduating from Northeastern, he worked at PricewaterhouseCoopers as a data analyst and consultant. He called select radio games for the Utica Comets of the American Hockey League from 2013 to 2015, filling in for Brendan Burke.

Looking to pursue a full-time career in broadcasting, Faust left PwC to freelance as an announcer, calling games for NBC Sports, NESN, ESPN, and Westwood One. He was hired to call college basketball games by NESN, and worked his way up to the lead play-by-play announcer for their coverage of Hockey East games.

Faust calls college football,  college basketball, and Major League Baseball games for Fox Sports. He had been named the television play-by-play voice for the Los Angeles Kings in June 2017, succeeding long-time Kings announcer Bob Miller. He called select Boston Red Sox games for NESN in 2019, filling in for Dave O'Brien when O'Brien had ACC Network commitments.

Notable calls 
On March 27, 2017, Faust called a national television game between the Chicago Blackhawks and Tampa Bay Lightning for NBC Sports, a game that ended up being his audition tape for the Kings. Faust has stated that he was suffering from a cold that morning and was unsure if he'd call the game in the first place. Faust's call of the game-winning goal in overtime was:> 45 seconds left in overtime, Duncan Keith able to settle. Panarin had it poke-checked away by Hedman. Here come the Lightning. Yanni Gourde, Scores!"

Personal life 
He currently resides in Southern California with his wife Carolyn.

In a 2018 interview with TMZ, Jeopardy! host Alex Trebek suggested Faust, as well as CNN legal analyst Laura Coates, as potential successors at host. Trebek noted that he had given Faust's name to the show's producers.

References

External links 
 
 Fox Sports PressPass

1989 births
Living people
American Hockey League broadcasters
American radio sports announcers
American television sports announcers
Boston Red Sox announcers
College basketball announcers in the United States
College football announcers
College hockey announcers in the United States
Journalists from New York (state)
Los Angeles Kings announcers
Major League Baseball broadcasters
Minor League Baseball broadcasters
National Hockey League broadcasters
Northeastern University alumni
People from Brooklyn
Tennis commentators